Zakariai (also Romanized as Zakarīā’ī, Zakarīyā’ī, and Z̄akaryā’ī; also known as Zakarriya and Z̄akaryā’) is a village in Shabankareh Rural District, Shabankareh District, Dashtestan County, Bushehr Province, Iran. At the 2006 census, its population was 523, in 126 families.

References 

Populated places in Dashtestan County